WZHL (101.7 FM, "WZHL") was a radio station licensed to serve the community of New Augusta, Mississippi, and serving the Laurel-Hattiesburg area.

Status
As of 2006, the station ceased broadcasting, having received a construction permit. The construction permit expires on March 3, 2011, at (or before) when it was expected that the station would have resumed broadcasting.

On November 21, 2014, the Federal Communications Commission canceled WZHL's license because the station had been silent for more than twelve months.

External links

ZHL
Defunct radio stations in the United States
Radio stations disestablished in 2014
2014 disestablishments in Mississippi
ZHL